Phellinus tremulae, the aspen bracket, is a species of polypore fungus in the family Hymenochaetaceae that grows on Populus tremula and on trembling aspen in Canada. The species was first described as Fomes igniarius f. tremulae by Appollinaris Semenovich Bondartsev in 1935. It causes the disease Aspen trunk rot.

References

tremulae
Fungi described in 1953